The following events related to sociology occurred in the 1940s.

1940
Marc Bloch's Feudal Society is published.
Marc Bloch's Strange Defeat; a Statement of Evidence is published.
Franz Boas's Race, Language and Culture is published.
Sir Edward Evans-Pritchard's The Nuer is published.
Meyer Fortes's African Political Systems is published.
David V. Glass's Population Policies and Movements in Europe is published.
Walter Benjamin's On the Concept of History is published.
Robert M. MacIver serves as president of the ASA.

Births
Claus Offe
George Ritzer

Deaths
September 27: Walter Benjamin

1941
Melville Jean Herskovits' The Myth of the Negro Past is published.
George Homans' English villages in the Thirteenth Century is published.
Harold Lasswell's The Garrison State is published.
Herbert Marcuse's Reason and Revolution is published.
Karl Marx's Grundrisse is published.
Pitirim Sorokin's Social and Cultural Dynamics is published.
William Lloyd Warner's Social Life of a Modern Community is published.

1942
William Beveridge's Social Insurance and Allied Services is published.
James Burnham's The Managerial revolution is published
Stuart C. Dodd's Dimensions of Society is published.
Georges Gurvitch's Sociology of Law is published.
Siegfried Frederick Nadel's A Black Byzantium is published.
Franz Leopold Neumann's Behemoth: The Structure and Practice of National Socialism is published.
Wilhelm Reich's The Mass Psychology of Fascism is published.
Joseph Schumpeter's Capitalism, Socialism and Democracy is published.
Dwight Sanderson serves as president of the American Sociological Association.

Births
Michael Mann
February 9: Manuel Castells

Deaths
May 16: Bronislaw Malinowski
December 22: Franz Boas

1943
Jean-Paul Sartre's Being and Nothingness is published.

1944
William Beveridge's Full Employment in a Free Society is published.
W. E. B. Du Bois' Jacob and Esau is published.
Morris Ginsberg's Moral Progress is published.
Friedrich Hayek' The Road to Serfdom is published.
Clyde Kluckhohn' Navajo Witchcraft is published.
Alfred Louis Kroeber' Configurations of Cultural Growth is published.
Paul Felix Lazarsfeld' The People's Choice is published.
Helen Merrell Lynd' England in the Eighteen Eighties: Toward a Social Basis for Freedom is published.
Gunnar Myrdal's An American Dilemma: The Negro Problem and Modern Democracy is published.
Karl Polanyi' The Great Transformation is published.
Rupert B. Vance serves as president of the ASA.

Births
July 19: Karin Knorr Cetina
Donna Haraway
Edmund Wnuk-Lipinski
Ulrich Beck

Deaths
February 7: Robert E. Park

1945
Ruth Fulton Benedict' The Chrysanthemum and the Sword is published.
Helen Merrell Lynd' Field Work in College Education is published.
Maurice Merleau-Ponty' Phenomenology of Perception is published.
Sir Karl Raimund Popper' The Open Society and its Enemies is published.

1946
Morris Janowitz's The Professional Soldier is published.
C. Wright Mills and Hans.H Gerth's  From Max Weber is published.
Viola Klein's The Feminine Character: History of an Ideology is published.
Carl C. Taylor serves as president of the American Sociological Association.
Activities of the German Society for Sociology are resumed and Leopold Von Weise becomes chairperson.

Births
April 12: Richard Machalek
September 7: Francisco Varela

1947
Theodor Adorno's The Stars down to Earth is published.
Theodor Adorno's and Max Horkheimer's Dialectic of Enlightenment is published.
Fei Xiaotong's Shengyu zhidu 《生育制度》 (The institutions for reproduction) is published.
Max Horkheimer's The Eclipse of Reason is published.
George Lundberg's Can Science Save Us? is published.
George Elton Mayo's The Social Problems of Industrial Civilization is published.
Thomas Humphrey Marshall's Sociology at the Crossroads is published.
Robert Morrison MacIver's The Web of Government is published.

1948
Chester Barnard's Organisation and Management is published.
Oliver Cox's Caste, Class and Race is published.
Kingsley Davis' Human Society is published.
Fei Xiaotong's Xiangtu chongjian 《鄉土重建》 (Rural recovery) is published.
Alfred Kinsey' Sexual Behaviour in the Human Male is published.
Robert Lowie' Social Organisation is published.
C. Wright Mills' The New Men of Power: America's Labor Leaders is published.
E. Franklin Frazier serves as president of the ASA.

Births
January 9: Claude S. Fischer

Deaths
September 17: Ruth Benedict

1949
Marc Bloch's The Historian's Craft is published.
Simone de Beauvoir's The Second Sex is published.
Meyer Fortes' The Web of Kinship among the Tallensi is published.
E. Franklin Frazier's The Negro in the United States is published.
Robert K. Merton's Social Theory and Social Structure is published.
Max Weber's General Economic History is published (posthumously).
International Sociological Association is founded.

Sociology
Sociology timelines
1940s decade overviews